The sixth season of Nigerian Idol premiered on 14 March 2021 on Africa Magic Network on DStv channel 198. The show host is IK Osakioduwa, while Obi Asika, Seyi Shay and DJ Sose as judges. On 3 February 2021, the show, was made available for streaming in United Kingdom, Italy, France, Australia and 23 other countries, through the online streaming network Showmax. On 9 May 2021, the first live show kicked-off featuring the 11 contestants, who made it to the finals, as public voting opens to the fans for 10 weeks.

Weekly Results And Songchoices

Top 11:The Classics (9 May)

Top 9 (16 May)

Top 8 (23 May)

Top 7: Birth year songs (30 May)

Top 6: Fela week (4 June)

Top 5: Morden Pop&Jazz (13 June)

Audition
On 28 November 2020, Nigerian Idol announced an online auditions to be held from 29 November to 13 December. The online audition participants are to record their 30 seconds video of them singing and to be uploaded on Africa Magic website.

Contestant

Theatre week
On 24 April 2021, 68 contestants head to theatre week. On 30 April 2021, at the end of the day, out of the 68 contestants that made it into theatre week, and 39 to the group selections, only 21 contestants progressed to the next round.

On 3 May 2021, during the third theatre week, contestants were assessed based on the strength of their voices and their overall stage performance. Out of 21 contestants who made the theatre week, only 11 made it to the finals. On 11 July 2021, Kingdom Kroseide emerged as the winner of the sixth season of the tvshow.

Nigerian Idol (season 7)

Finalists

Finalists
(ages stated at time of contest)

Elimination Chart 
Colour key

References

2021 Nigerian television seasons